The town of Arghandab is the center of Arghandab District in Kandahar Province, Afghanistan, in the valley of Arghandab River northwest from Kandahar.

Climate

References 

Populated places in Kandahar Province